Ralph Lanier Rhodes (born February 9, 1975) is an American politician who has served in the Georgia House of Representatives from the 120th district since 2015.

References

1975 births
Living people
Republican Party members of the Georgia House of Representatives
21st-century American politicians